Andrew Lake is a lake on Adak Island, part of the Aleutian Islands, Alaska. It is a part of the Adak Naval Air Station and lies between Mount Adagdak and Mount Moffett. The lake is separated from the Bering Sea by a seawall.

See also
List of lakes in Alaska

Lakes of Alaska
Bodies of water of Aleutians West Census Area, Alaska